Jack Hopkins was an English footballer who played in the Football League for Wolverhampton Wanderers.

References

English footballers
Association football forwards
English Football League players
Liverpool F.C. players
Wolverhampton Wanderers F.C. players
Gillingham F.C. players